Castellior is a hamlet in the  community of Penmynydd, Ynys Môn, Wales, which is 129.1 miles (207.7 km) from Cardiff and 208.9 miles (336.2 km) from London.

References

See also
List of localities in Wales by population

Villages in Anglesey